The M51 SLBM is a French submarine-launched ballistic missile, built by ArianeGroup, and deployed with the French Navy. Designed to replace the M45 SLBM (In French terminology the MSBS – Mer-Sol-Balistique-Stratégique "Sea-ground-Strategic ballistic"), it was first deployed in 2010.

Each missile carries six to ten independently targetable TN 75 thermonuclear warheads.

The three-stage engine of the M51 is directly derived from the solid propellant boosters of Ariane 5. Like other blunt-nosed SLBM examples, such as the Trident D5, the M51 uses an extensible aerospike in the nose.

Design work on the M5 started in the late 1980s by Aérospatiale, before the programme was renamed the M51 in 1996, when development costs decreased by 20 percent. The M51 entered service in 2010.

Development 

After having spent €5 billion ($6.7 billion) developing the missile, the French government placed a €3 billion ($3.9 billion) order with EADS SPACE Transportation for the M51 in December 2004. The contract covered serial production of the M51 for 10 years, with the company to be responsible for sustained readiness support throughout the missile's life.

The M51 performed its first flight test (unarmed) on 9 November 2006 from the French missile flight test centre in Biscarrosse (Landes). The target was reached twenty minutes later, in the north-west of the Atlantic Ocean.

A second and third successful test were carried out on 21 June 2007 and 13 November 2008.

A 10 July 2010 test validated the 's capacity to launch the M51 in operational conditions.

On 5 May 2013, an M51 flight test missile failed after being fired by a submerged ballistic missile submarine off the coast of Brittany. This was the first failed launch of the M51 after five successful launches since 2006.

In 2014 Airbus signed a deal with the French government for development work on an upgrade designated M51.3 to equip the successor to the Triomphant class.

On 30 September 2015, a M51 was successfully test-flown from a land-based missile site near Biscarrosse to a desolate target in the North Atlantic.

On 10 May 2016 Airbus and Safran signed a joint 50-50 partnership to develop the M51.3 upgrade intended to enter service around 2025.

On 12 June 2020, a successful test launch of an M51.3 missile (supposedly) was conducted from the Le Téméraire Triomphant-class submarine off the south-west tip of Finistère (Brittany).

On April 28, 2021 French Ministry of Armed Forces announced that it had tested an M51 submarine-launched ballistic missile (SLBM). The test was not launched from a French Navy Le Triomphant-class submarine but from a land based facility located in South Western France.

Operators
 
French Navy – Primary armament for the Triomphant-class SSBN and the future SNLE 3G SSBN

See also
 M45 (missile)
 R-29 Vysota
 R-29RM Shtil
 R-29RMU Sineva
 R-29RMU2 Layner
 RSM-56 Bulava
 UGM-133 Trident II
 JL-2
 JL-3
 R-39 Rif
 R-39M

Sources and references

External links
nrdc.org: Table of French Nuclear Forces, 2002
globalsecurity.org M-5 / M-51
M51 Gives France More Flexible Deterrent To Meet Changing Threats, Aviation Week
M51 test launch (YouTube)

Submarine-launched ballistic missiles of France
Nuclear weapons of France
Military equipment introduced in the 2010s